Arrandale is the code name for a family of mobile Intel processors, sold as mobile Intel Core i3, i5 and i7 as well as Celeron and Pentium. It is closely related to the desktop Clarkdale processor; both use dual-core dies based on the Westmere 32 nm die shrink of the Nehalem microarchitecture, and have integrated Graphics as well as PCI Express and DMI links.

Arrandale is the successor of the 45 nm Core-microarchitecture-based Penryn processor that is used in many of the mobile Intel Core 2, Celeron and Pentium Dual-Core processors. While Penryn typically used both a north bridge and a south bridge, Arrandale already contains the major northbridge components, which are the memory controller, PCI Express bus for external graphics, integrated graphics, and the DMI interface, making it possible to build more compact systems.

The Arrandale processor package contains two dies: the 32 nm processor die with the I/O connections, and the 45 nm Intel HD Graphics (Ironlake) controller and integrated memory controller die. Physical separation of the processor die and memory controller die resulted in increased memory latency.

Arrandale was released on 7 January 2010, during CES 2010.

Brand names 
Arrandale processors were sold under the Celeron, Pentium, Intel Core i3, Intel Core i5 and Intel Core i7 brand names, with only the Core i7 models using the full L3 cache and all features. Processors ending in E instead of M are embedded versions with support for PCIe bifurcation and ECC memory, while the regular mobile versions only support a single PCIe port and non-ECC memory.
The Celeron versions of Arrandale have the smallest L3 cache of just 2 MB.

See also 
 Consumer Ultra-Low Voltage (CULV) computing platform
 List of Macintosh models grouped by CPU type

References 

Computer-related introductions in 2010